The following highways are numbered 426:

Japan
 Japan National Route 426

United States
 Florida:
  Florida State Road 426
  Florida State Road 426A (former)
  County Road 426 (Seminole County, Florida) (unsigned)
  County Road 426A (Seminole County, Florida)
  Louisiana Highway 426
  Maryland Route 426
  Nevada State Route 426
  New York State Route 426
  Pennsylvania Route 426
  Puerto Rico Highway 426